Tales from the Hollywood Hills: Pat Hobby Teamed with Genius is a 1987 American TV movie based on The Pat Hobby Stories by F. Scott Fitzgerald. It was written and directed by Rob Thompson.

It was the third and final installment of Tales from the Hollywood Hills, on PBS' Great Performances.

Cast
Christopher Lloyd as Pat Hobby
Colin Firth as René Wilcox
Joseph Campanella as Jack Berners
Dennis Franz as Louie 
Beverly Sanders as Mrs. Robinson 
Wendy Schaal as Earle

External links

Film page at TCMDB

Review at Los Angeles Times

1987 television films
1987 films
American television films